Edward Breaks (29 December 1919 – November 2000) was an English professional footballer who played in the Football League as a left back for Halifax Town.

Life and career
Breaks was born in 1919 in Halifax, in the West Riding of Yorkshire. He worked at John Holdsworth & Co textile mills in the town before the Second World War. He was called up in 1940, served with the 7th Queen's Own Hussars, and had a narrow escape when the tank he was driving was struck by a German shell. He played football while in the services, captained his regimental team, and after demobilisation he returned to Holdsworth's and played for the Shaw Lodge Mills works team. Breaks joined Halifax Town on amateur forms in 1947, and became a part-time professional a year later: he thought he was too old to take the risk of embarking on a full-time professional career.

The team started the 1948–49 season badly, and Breaks was promoted from the reserves. He made his senior debut on 13 September 1948 against Mansfield Town in the Third Division North. Although the team continued to struggle, Breaks did not. Over the next seven seasonsfour as a first-team regularhe made 179 appearances in the Football League Third Division North, and was spoken of as a possible replacement at Southampton after Alf Ramsey's move to Tottenham Hotspur. He scored once, when he injured a knee against Crewe Alexandra in 1950: unable to play in defence, he was still able to wander about the forward line. He shared a benefit match with the equally long-serving David McCormick in April 1955, in which Halifax Town lost 10–4 to a Football League Select XI which included their own player-manager, Willie Watson. Breaks became reserve-team coach in 1956, and acted as first-team trainer after Alan Ure retired in January 1962. After manager Harry Hooper also left the club, Breaks followed suit during the 1962 close season.

Breaks returned to work at Holdsworth's, while continuing his involvement with football at local level with Hebden Bridge as player and coach and then as coach of St Mary's.

Breaks and his wife, Maureen, had a daughter, Christine. He died in a Halifax nursing home at the age of 80 in November 2000.

Career statistics

Notes

References

Sources
 

1919 births
2000 deaths
Footballers from Halifax, West Yorkshire
English footballers
Association football fullbacks
Halifax Town A.F.C. players
English Football League players
Date of death missing
7th Queen's Own Hussars soldiers
British Army personnel of World War II